Santa Lucía del Este is a seaside resort in Canelones Department, Uruguay.

References

External links 

 Instituto Nacional de Estadística: Plano de Santa Lucía del Este y Araminda

Populated places in the Canelones Department
Seaside resorts in Uruguay